Mikhael Subotzky (born Cape Town, South Africa, 1981) is a South African artist based in Johannesburg. His installation, film, video and photographic work have been exhibited widely in museums and galleries, and received awards including the KLM Paul Huf Award, W. Eugene Smith Grant, Oskar Barnack Award and the Discovery Award at Rencontres d'Arles. He has published the books Beaufort West (2008), Retinal Shift (2012) and, with Patrick Waterhouse, Ponte City (2014). Subotzky is a member of Magnum Photos.

Life and work
Subotzky graduated from the Michaelis School of Fine Art at the University of Cape Town in 2004.

For his book Beaufort West, Subotzky photographed in and around a prison built within a traffic circle in the town of Beaufort West.

For six years he and Patrick Waterhouse collaborated in photographing in Ponte City, a 54-storey cylindrical building in Johannesburg – the tallest residential tower block in Africa – resulting in their book and exhibition Ponte City. They photographed the residents, interiors and exteriors of the building, and produced a series of giant tableaux, made up of hundreds of contact sheets, presented in towering light boxes. Their book Ponte City won the Deutsche Börse Photography Prize 2015.

Subotzky became a Magnum Photos nominee in 2007 and a full member in 2011.

Publications
Beaufort West. With an essay by Jonny Steinberg.
London: Chris Boot, 2008. .
London: Chris Boot, 2014. . Special edition.
Retinal Shift. Göttingen: Steidl, 2012. . Edited by Ivan Vladislavic, texts by Anthea Buys and Sean O'Toole. Catalogue for his Standard Bank Young Artist Exhibition.
Mikhael Subotzky: photographe = photographer. Montreuil: l'Oeil, 2007. . Text in English and French.

Publications with others

 Ponte City. Göttingen: Steidl, 2014. . With Patrick Waterhouse, edited by Ivan Vladislavic. Catalog of an exhibition held at Le Bal, Paris and Fotomuseum Antwerp, Belgium in 2014.
Vos Reves Nous Derangent. Paris: Actes Sud, 2013. . Photographs by Subotzky, Dulce Pinzon and Achinto Bhadra, texts by Mathieu Potte-Bonneville and Bertrand Ogilvie; includes text in English by Fred Ritchin translated into French by Sally Laruelle.

Exhibitions
2005: Die Vier Hoeke = The Four Corners, Pollsmoor Prison, Cape Town, South Africa.
2008: New Photography: Josephine Meckseper and Mikhael Subotzky, Museum of Modern Art, New York. With Josephine Meckseper.
2009: Still Revolution: Suspended in Time, Museum of Contemporary Canadian Art, Toronto, May–June 2009. Group exhibition with Subotzky, Barbara Astman, Walead Beshty, Mat Collishaw, Stan Douglas, Idris Khan, Trevor Paglen, and Martha Rosler.
2011: Figures & Fictions: Contemporary South African Photography, Victoria and Albert Museum, London. Group exhibition.
2012: Retinal Shift, Standard Bank Young Artist 2012, Iziko South African Museum.
2014: Ponte City, Le Bal, Paris, January–April 2014. With Patrick Waterhouse.

Awards

2007: Young Photographer category, Ville de Perpignan Rémi Ochlik award, Visa pour l'image, Perpignan.
2007: KLM Paul Huf Award, Foam Fotografiemuseum Amsterdam, Amsterdam.
2008: W. Eugene Smith Grant from the W. Eugene Smith Memorial Fund.
2009: Oskar Barnack Award for Beaufort West.
2011: Discovery Award, Rencontres d'Arles, with Patrick Waterhouse, for Ponte City.
2015: Deutsche Börse Photography Prize 2015, with Patrick Waterhouse, for Ponte City.

References

External links
 
Subotzky's profile at Goodman Gallery
Subotzky's profile at Magnum Photos
Subotzky & Waterhouse on Ponte City (3 min video)
21 Icons - Subotzky - Short Film (3 min video)
Subotzky: Standard Bank Young Artist Award 2012 (4 min video)
Subotzky: To see as a photographer sees (14 min video)

1981 births
Living people
Magnum photographers
South African photographers